Michael Furey may refer to:

 Sax Rohmer, who wrote his occult novel Wulfheim under this name
 Michael Furey, a character in  "The Dead", the last short story in Dubliners by James Joyce
 Mike Furey, singer and songwriter for Dangerous Muse

See also
 Michael Fury, ring name used by wrestler Michael Iorio
 Mike Furrey (born 1977), American football player